Lake Havasu City is a city in Mohave County, Arizona, United States. As of the 2020 census, the population of the city was 57,144, up from 52,527 in 2010. It is served by Lake Havasu City Airport.

History
The community first started as an Army Air Corps rest camp, called "Site Six" during World War II, on the shores of Lake Havasu. In 1958, American businessman Robert P. McCulloch purchased  of property on the east side of the lake along Pittsburgh Point, a peninsula that would eventually be transformed into an island.

After four years of planning, McCulloch Properties acquired another  of federal land in the surrounding area. Lake Havasu City was established on September 30, 1963, by a resolution of the Mohave County Board of Supervisors, as the Lake Havasu Irrigation and Drainage District, making it a legal entity (the act is referenced in resolution #63-12-1). The city was incorporated in 1978.

London Bridge
London Bridge crosses the narrow Bridgewater Channel that leads from Lake Havasu (a segment of the Colorado River) to Thompson Bay (also on the river). Hoping to attract tourists and prospective buyers of residential lots, McCulloch bought it for US$2.5 million from the City of London when the bridge was replaced in 1968. The bridge was disassembled on contract with Sundt Construction of Tucson, and the marked stones were shipped to Lake Havasu City and reassembled by Sundt for another US$7 million. The construction took three years to complete.

McCulloch gave an acre of land in Lake Havasu City to London. When Lake Havasu City wanted to use this land for a visitors' center, London leased it back for a quit rent of a Hopi Kachina figure.

Since its inauguration on October 5, 1971, London Bridge has become the second-largest tourist attraction in Arizona, after the Grand Canyon. In 2017, a panel of experts partnering with USA Todays 10Best.com chose London Bridge as one of 20 initial nominees for Best Arizona Attraction. 10Best.com readers voted London Bridge as a top 5 favorite.

Events
Lake Havasu City is an active event destination for a wide range of people. During spring months, the community is joined by university students for spring break. In 1995, Lake Havasu City was featured during MTV's Spring Break coverage. Attendance during Spring Break has taken a downturn in recent years, as the city has declined to issue permits to the large party organizers.

For boaters, March to September are the prime months on Lake Havasu. The city is also home to the International World Jet Ski Final Races, multiple professional fishing tournaments, custom boat regattas, the Western Winter Blast pyrotechnics convention, Havasu 95 Speedway, the Chilln-n-Swilln Beer Festival annual charity event, the Havasu Triathlon, and the Havasu Balloon Festival & Fair.

During the winter months, the community is joined by retirees from colder regions of the country and Canada. During this period, multiple events are held on McCulloch Boulevard. Typically during the second weekend of February, McCulloch Boulevard is home to Winterfest, an annual event which draws thousands of visitors and residents for two days of food, activities, entertainment, and products from over 200 vendors from across the United States.

Geography 

Transportation 

The only surface access to Lake Havasu City is by road via Arizona State Route 95, which meets Interstate 40  to the north of the city and Interstate 10  to the south. C. V. Wood, who designed Disneyland, was hired by Robert McCulloch to lay out Lake Havasu's unique road system.

In the early stages of development of the city, McCulloch Properties operated a fleet of secondhand airliners such as the Lockheed Constellation and the Lockheed L-188 Electra to fly prospective property purchasers to the area from California and elsewhere in the United States.

The city operates Lake Havasu City Transit. Vegas Airporter provides service from Lake Havasu City to Harry Reid International Airport in Las Vegas. Havasu Landing Resort and Casino provides a ferry to Havasu Lake, California.

Lake Havasu City Airport, also known as Lake Havasu City Municipal Airport, is a general aviation airport owned by the city and located 6 miles north of the central business district of Lake Havasu City.

Climate
Lake Havasu City has a hot desert climate (BWh), with extremely hot summers, mild winters, and very little rainfall. The hottest temperature in Arizona was recorded in Havasu City.   Lake Havasu City is a very hot city, even by Arizona standards; here, the highest temperature ever recorded in the state, 128 °F (53 °C), was set on June 29, 1994.  Temperatures may exceed 100 °F (38 °C) as early as April or as late as October, and in the summer months, it routinely reaches 110 °F (43 °C), and can even get up to 120 °F (49 °C) or higher during the worst heat waves. Overnight low temperatures generally stay between 80 °F to 90 °F (27–32 °C) for the months of July and August, but the highest overnight low temperature (record high minimum) ever recorded was 98 °F (37 °C) on July 22, 2003.

The winters, on the other hand, are very pleasant, with typical daily highs in the 60s and 70s Fahrenheit (16–26 °C), and infrequent night frosts. Mean annual rainfall is only 4.16 inches (106 millimeters); winter is the wettest season, but even then, rain occurs on an average of only 2–3 days per month.

Demographics

As of the census of 2000, there were 41,938 people, 17,911 households, and 12,716 families residing in the city. The racial makeup of the city was 94.4% White, 0.3% Black or African American, 0.7% Native American, 0.6% Asian, 0.1% Pacific Islander, 2.5% from other races, and 1.5% from two or more races. 7.9% of the population were Hispanic or Latino of any race.

There were 17,911 households, out of which 22.5% had children under the age of 18 living with them, 59.4% were married couples living together, 7.7% had a female householder with no husband present, and 29.0% were non-families. 22.8% of all households were made up of individuals, and 11.8% had someone living alone who was 65 years of age or older. The average household size was 2.32 and the average family size was 2.69.

In the city, the population was spread out, with 19.4% under the age of 18, 5.7% from 18 to 24, 21.6% from 25 to 44, 27.7% from 45 to 64, and 25.5% who were 65 years of age or older. The median age was 48 years. For every 100 females, there were 96.8 males. For every 100 females age 18 and over, there were 94.3 males.

The median income for a household in the city was $36,499, and the median income for a family was $41,393. Males had a median income of $31,594 versus $21,576 for females. The per capita income for the city was $20,403. About 6.6% of families and 9.5% of the population were below the poverty line, including 15.8% of those under age 18 and 5.2% of those age 65 or over.

In 2007, Lake Havasu was named one of the Top 100 places to live in America by RelocateAmerica.  CNN has also listed the community among their top retirement cities in the country.

Education
Lake Havasu City is served by the Lake Havasu Unified School District. There are currently six elementary schools (Jamaica Elementary, Oro Grande Classical Academy, Starline Elementary, Smoketree Elementary, Nautilus Elementary, and Havasupai Elementary), one middle school (Thunderbolt Middle School), one high school (Lake Havasu High School), and several alternative schools in the city. Lake Havasu Unified went through some strict budget cuts, closing one of its two middle schools (Daytona Middle School), and distributing 6th graders throughout the elementaries and 7th and 8th grades to Thunderbolt Middle School. Local voters passed a bond and a budget override for the district in 2016, helping to alleviate some school district budget problems.

In a 2008 nationwide survey, Forbes magazine ranked Lake Havasu City "The Least Educated City in America", using information from statistics on the Lake Havasu – Kingman Metropolitan Statistical Area which encompasses Mohave County Arizona coming up last in the number of college graduates living in the city.

A campus of Mohave Community College is located in Lake Havasu City. MCC also is home of one of the Northern Arizona University extended campuses. Arizona State University opened a new lower-tuition 4-year college campus, the ASU Colleges at Lake Havasu City, in August 2012.

Government
The city operates under a council-manager form of government.  The mayor and six councilmembers are elected to staggered four-year terms.  The City Council sets the city's policy and direction, and appoints the City Manager who is tasked with the responsibility for carrying out council policies and administering the day-to-day operations.  Per the City Code, the Department Directors are appointed by the City Manager.

As of November, 2008, 64 percent of registered voters in Lake Havasu City are Republican, 35 percent Democrat, and the remaining 1 percent Independent.

Lake Havasu City hosted the final appreciation dinner for retiring United States Senator Barry Goldwater, the 1964 Republican Party presidential nominee, at the Nautical Inn Convention Center on October 21, 1986.

Notable people
 David Bazan, indie rock singer-songwriter, most notably of Pedro the Lion
 Michael Biehn, actor
 Crystal Hefner, Playboy Miss December 2009, widow of the late Hugh Hefner
 Robert P. McCulloch, CEO of McCulloch chainsaws and purchaser of the London Bridge tourist attraction
 Bob Milacki, former Major League baseball pitcher
 Gary Simmons, former National hockey league player

In popular culture

Route 66 filmed a 1962 episode entitled "Go Read the River" in the area which became Lake Havasu City just a few years later. The "Site Six" test site and Thompson Bay are mentioned prominently in the fictional story of a McCulloch company engineer working on a new speedboat motor which he tests while racing across Lake Havasu.

The Day of the Wolves is a 1971 heist film starring Richard Egan. It was directed, written and produced by Ferde Grofe Jr. It was the first movie to be made on location in the new town of Lake Havasu City.

The London Bridge's relocation to Arizona was the basis of a 1985 made-for-TV movie Bridge Across Time (also known as Arizona Ripper or Terror at London Bridge), directed by E.W. Swackhamer and starring David Hasselhoff and Stepfanie Kramer.  In the film, a series of murders in Lake Havasu is attributed to the spirit of Jack the Ripper, whose soul is transported to America in one of the bricks of the London Bridge.

The director Andy Sidaris has directed three soft-core adult films in Lake Havasu: 1989's Savage Beach, 1990's Guns, and 1992's Hard Hunted.

MTV featured Lake Havasu during its Spring Break coverage in 1995.

The comedy-adventure Border to Border was filmed in Lake Havasu in 1998. Actor Curtis Armstrong and Lisa Arturo were the leads, with a cameo by porn star Ron Jeremy.

Piranha 3D was filmed in Lake Havasu in 2009. The city was called Lake Victoria in the film. It was directed by Alexandre Aja and starred Adam Scott, Elisabeth Shue, Kelly Brook, Richard Dreyfuss, Jerry O'Connell, Ving Rhames and Christopher Lloyd. The film is a remake of the 1978 film Piranha. It debuted in Lake Havasu on August 19, 2010, and was released nationally on August 20, 2010.

The Concepts x New Balance Made in U.K. 991.5 "Lake Havasu" athletic shoe was inspired by the story of the London Bridge's relocation to Arizona, and the transatlantic partnership between U.K. shoe manufacturer New Balance and American shoe retailer Concepts. Lake Havasu City Mayor Mark Nexsen officially declared February 27, 2018 as "Concepts/New Balance 991.5 'Made in U.K.' Lake Havasu Shoe Day."

Indie rock band Pedro the Lion's sixth studio album Havasu was written about the one year of childhood the singer spent living in the city.

Attractions
 London Bridge
 London Bridge Resort
 Lake Havasu Golf Club (36 holes)
 Islander RV Resort
 The Nautical Beachfront Resort
 Lake Havasu and Colorado River
 Wheeler Park
 Lake Havasu Historical Society
 Havasu 95 Speedway
 The Aquatic Center
 Patrick Tinell Memorial Skatepark
 Rotary Park
 The Famous Turtle Beach Bar
 The Shops at Lake Havasu
 Lake Havasu Art Collective
 Lake Havasu City Airport (KHII)
 Minor league baseball: the Blythe Heat of the Arizona Winter League and the Lake Havasu Heat of the Pacific Southwest Baseball League play regular season games.
 Sandpoint Marina RV Resort
 Lighthouses on the Colorado River

References

External links

 
 Lake Havasu City Guide
 Lake Havasu City Visitors Bureau
 Lake Havasu City Chamber of Commerce

 
Cities in Arizona
Arizona placenames of Native American origin
Lake Havasu
Micropolitan areas of Arizona
Cities in Mohave County, Arizona
Lower Colorado River Valley
Populated places in the Sonoran Desert
Populated places established in 1964
1964 establishments in Arizona
Arizona populated places on the Colorado River